The 2013–14 NCAA Division II men's ice hockey season began on November 1, 2013 and concluded on March 1 of the following year. This was the 32nd season of second-tier college ice hockey.

Regular season

Standings

See also
 2013–14 NCAA Division I men's ice hockey season
 2013–14 NCAA Division III men's ice hockey season

References

External links

 
NCAA